Bal Bahadur KC was a former minister of Nepal. Currently, he is the member of working committee of Nepali Congress. He has won from Solukhumbu-1 in the Nepalese Constituent Assembly Election, 2013. He was summoned by the Supreme Court of Nepal against the charges of rigging the constituent election. He was accused of misuse of authority in 2001 A.D. as Minister of Civil Aviation.

He began his career working as student leader in 1971 A.D. He served as President of Nepal Student Union between 1984 and 1988. He won three consecutive parliamentary elections in 1991, 1994 and 1999.

Family 
He was born on July 17, 1953 A.D. in Salyan VDC, Solukhumbu District to father Lal Bahadur KC and mother Maheshwari KC.

References 

Government ministers of Nepal
1953 births
Living people
Nepal MPs 1994–1999
Nepal MPs 1991–1994
Nepal MPs 1999–2002
People from Solukhumbu District
Nepali Congress politicians from Koshi Province
Khas people
Members of the 2nd Nepalese Constituent Assembly